The Village Cross, West Derby, Liverpool, England designed by William Eden Nesfield between 1861 and 1870. The carved capital, of what appears to be a column rather than a cross, is supposedly of John of England, during his reign West Derby would have been an important castle.

External links
 

Grade II* listed buildings in Liverpool